Oxynoe kabirensis is a species of small sea snail or sea slug, a bubble snail, a marine gastropod mollusk in the family Oxynoidae.

Distribution
This species has only been found in Japan. The type locality for this species is Ishigaki Island, Ryukyu Islands.

References

External links 
Images of Oxynoe kabirensis
 http://www.seaslugforum.net/oxynkabi.htm

Oxynoidae
Gastropods described in 1980